A by-election was held for the New South Wales Legislative Assembly electorate of Mudgee on 6 January 1879 because of the resignation of Sir John Robertson who was then appointed to the Legislative Council, to facilitate the coalition of his supporters and those of Sir Henry Parkes to form an effective government.

Dates

Candidates
Richard Rouse was a former member for Mudgee, winning the 1876 by-election, before being defeated by Robertson at the 1877 election.
David Buchanan was a former member for Goldfields West, who had been defeated at the 1877 election.

Results

Sir John Robertson  resigned to be appointed to the Legislative Council.

Aftermath
In March 1879 the Committee of Elections and Qualifications overturned the election of Richard Rouse and declared that David Buchanan was elected as the member for Mudgee.

See also
Electoral results for the district of Mudgee
List of New South Wales state by-elections

References

1879 elections in Australia
New South Wales state by-elections
1870s in New South Wales